The CMS file system is the native file system of IBM's Conversational Monitor System (CMS), a component of VM . It was the only file system for CMS until the introduction of the CMS Shared File System with VM/SP.

Minidisks 
CP-67 and VM allow an installation to divide a disk volume into virtual disks called minidisks. A minidisk may be a CMS minidisk, initialized with the CMS file system. Other minidisks might be formatted for use by, e.g., OS/360, but these are not CMS minidisks even if they are assigned to a CMS virtual machine.

A CMS virtual machine can have up to ten minidisks accessed at one time. The user references the minidisks by a letter, part of a field called the filemode. The S disk contains CMS system files and is read-only; the Y disk is usually an extension of S. The read/write A disk contains user files such as customization data, program sources, and executables.  Other drive letters B through Z can contain data as defined by the user. If a file is opened without a filemode letter specified (FILENAME FILETYPE *) the disks will be searched in alphabetic order. The second character of the filemode is a number indicating read, write, and sharing attributes.

The ACCESS command is used to access a minidisk. For example: ACCESS 191 A would access the virtual disk assigned to this user as unit "191" (virtual channel and unit address) as minidisk "A".

A CMS minidisk in early versions of CMS is formatted into 800-byte blocks. Later versions of CMS allow minidisks formatted as 1024-, 2048-, or 4096-byte blocks, which increased the limits described here to 231 disk blocks and 231 records.

The first two blocks on a minidisk are reserved for IPL. The third block contains the label identifying the minidisk. The fourth block, called the Master File Directory or MFD, is the directory header for the minidisk. The MFD also contains a bitmap called QMSK indicating the status of each 800-byte block on disk, used for allocation. Following the MFD all record types may be scattered and intermixed on a disk.

File system structure
CMS uses a flat file system. The MFD contains an array of disk addresses of blocks containing File Status Table (FST) (directory) entries. Each FST block contains twenty 40-byte FST entries, each describing a file. The contents of one FST entry are:

The FST entry points to the first chain link block for the file. The first chain link block contains the disk addresses of up to 40 additional chain link blocks, followed by the disk addresses of up to 60 data blocks. The remaining chain link blocks each contain the disk addresses of up to 400 data blocks. this results in a maximum size of 16,060 800-byte blocks, or 12,848,000 bytes, for any CMS file. The maximum number of records in one file is 65,533.

Records are usually called items in CMS terminology. CMS files can have either fixed or variable record format; record types may not be mixed in a file. For fixed-length records the length is defined by FSTLRECL, and the location of any fixed-length record can be computed by (item_number-1) * record_length/800. The quotient will be the block number and the remainder will be the offset of the item in the block. Variable-length records have a maximum length of FSTLRECL bytes, and are preceded by a two-byte record length field indicating the actual length.

In 1979, Virtual Machine/System Extensions (VM/SE or SEPP) Release 2 and Virtual Machine/Basic System Extensions (VM/BSE or BSEPP) Release 2 provided an enhancement to the original CMS file system, called Enhanced Disk Format (EDF), that allows larger files by expanding the FST and introducing multiple levels of chain link blocks.

See also
 IBM System/360 architecture
 ESA/390
 z/Architecture

Notes

References

Disk file systems
IBM file systems
IBM mainframe operating systems
VM (operating system)